The DS 3 (formerly known as Citroën DS3 and DS 3 Crossback) is a luxury supermini initially produced by the French automobile manufacturer Citroën and officially launched in January 2010. This was the first and entry-level model from the DS premium sub-brand (pronounced déesse, which is French for goddess), which was spun-off in 2016 into DS Automobiles.

Originally manufactured as a three-door supermini hatchback with a convertible variation from 2009 to 2019, the second generation became a five-door Crossover SUV, named as DS 3 Crossback from 2018 to 2022.

The model was named "2010 Car of the Year" by Top Gear, awarded first supermini four times in a row by the JD Power Satisfaction Survey UK and second most efficient supermini (Citroën DS3 1.6 e-HDi 115 Airdream) by What Car? behind the Citroën C3. In 2013, it was again the most sold premium subcompact car with 40% of these market shares in Europe.



First generation (2009)

The vehicle was initially intended to be sold as a 3-door second-generation Citroën C3. 2007 advanced projets are showing the vehicle sharing an identical front with the production second-generation C3 and no mention to the DS sub-brand. At this stage, the vehicle was named Citroën C3 Coupé.

The original Citroën DS3 design was first introduced as a concept car named Citroën DS Inside, unveiled on February 5, 2009 at the Geneva Motor Show, introducing both the 2009 Citroën logo redesign and their DS sub-brand. The production model, called Citroën DS3, was introduced in August 2009, two months after the Citroën C3 II,  with no emphasis that the two cars were having a lot in common.

Citroën revamped their DS3 line for the summer of 2011 with a new, limited edition model, a new colour and a new decal on the roof.  The new colour is brun Hickory, a shade of dark brown that recently made its debut on the DS3's bigger sibling, the DS4. One of the DS3's strongest selling points is the ability for a customer to personalize their car when they order it by mixing and matching body and roof colours, decals, and so on. This new colour helps that by bringing the total amount of available body colours to ten.

The DS3 features prominently in the video for the Pixie Lott song "What Do You Take Me For". It is the first car that has had product placement in a British music video.

The DS3 range received a mild facelift in 2014, with revised engines and new design of Xenon-LED headlights for the top of the range models. The new BlueHDi diesel, available in two states of tune, has a low  emissions level of 79g/km. It received a new facelift in 2016, completely dropping any reference to Citroën and its logo.

DS3 Racing
A  version, the DS3 Racing, was introduced at the 2010 Geneva Motor Show. It is the road version of Citroën's rally specification car DS3 R3.

The DS3 Racing was offered in only two colours, white with grey accents or black with orange accents including roof, wheels and interior. Besides these unique colour schemes, the DS3 Racing is distinguished from other trim levels by the use of real carbon fibre on the front splitter, grill, wheel arches and rear diffuser. Additionally, carbon fibre is prominently featured on the interior.

In October 2011, Citroën announced that they were planning on building a total of 2,400 DS3 Racings, significantly more than the 1,000 initially planned in 2010.

The Citroën DS3 WRC was used by the Citroën World Rally Team in WRC competitions between 2011 and 2016.

DS3 Cabrio

Citroën unveiled the DS3 Cabrio at the Paris Motor Show in September 2012, with sales commencing in 2013.

As a fixed profile convertible, the DS 3 retains its side bodywork, allowing for a roll back center fabric sunroof – similar to other fixed profile convertibles including the Fiat 500 (2007), Nissan Figaro (1991), Citroën 2CV (1948–1990) and the Nash Rambler Convertible "Landau" Coupe (1950).

Matière Grise edition
Citroën announced the "Matière Grise" limited edition of 750 cars for the European market. It is finished in flat grey paint with chromed mirrors, chromed door trim and chromed tail light surrounds. The roof can be ordered in either white or black and the only available wheels are 17″ alloys, also available in white and black.

Facelift
In February 2016, the facelifted DS 3 was announced by DS Automobiles, as part of their separation from Citroën to become a standalone brand. The new DS 3 was launched at that year's Geneva Motor Show. The revised model no longer featured Citroën badges, with the DS badge now featuring prominently on the front grille. The trim level names were also changed from DSign, DStyle and DSport and re introduced as Chic, Elegance and Prestige. An Ultra Prestige model was also added.

The facelifted model is identified by a revised front and rear design, plus the new range of PSA engines incorporating the 1.2-litre three cylinder PureTech petrol engines (available in normally aspirated 82 bhp and turbocharged 110 and 130 bhp variants), the 1.6-litre THP turbocharged petrol engine with 165 bhp, and 1.6-litre BlueHDi turbo diesel engines with 100 and 120 bhp. In addition, a new DS 3 Performance model was introduced with the THP engine uprated to 210 bhp, with a 0–100 km/h time of 6.5 seconds.

In June 2016, DS partnered with French luxury fashion and perfume company Givenchy and launched the DS 3 Givenchy Le MakeUp special edition. A total of 500 Givenchy models were built and include unique features such as a textured matt white body with metallic purple roof and door mirrors, a rose pink dashboard strip and a make-up storage kit in the front central armrest. It is available with the PureTech 110 engine in manual or automatic transmission, and is based on the mid range Elegance trim level.

The DS Performance Line was launched in September 2016, enabling the DS customer to have performance styling without any mechanical upgrades. DS 3 Performance Line includes aesthetics such as gloss black alloy wheels, black contrasting roof colour, exterior stripe graphics and interior coloured stitching.

Specifications

Safety

Sales and production

Second generation (2018)

The second generation of DS 3 was presented for the first time on 13 September 2018, with public premiere is at the 88th Paris Motor Show in October 2018.   Although keeping some key design elements from the previous generation - such as the floating roof and the partial B-pillar - its body style became a 5-door crossover SUV and the model changed its name to DS 3 Crossback. The SUV is the first DS vehicle based on the PSA EMP1 platform shared with the Peugeot 208. Powertrains include a range of petrol and diesel engines and an electric version.

A fully electric version, known as "E-Tense", is also sold. In January 2020, monthly sales of the electric version were over 700 units.

Facelift
The facelift was introduced on 26 September 2022 alongside Paris Fashion Week, with its name changed back into DS 3 (but marketed as New DS 3).

The grille is restyled with emphasis on gloss black with subtle chromed-diamond tips. The DS Wings have been tweaked to join the grille and headlamps, which  have a more dynamic design on the inside with bigger LEDs - two LED lines are vertically-arranged on either side of the front.

The E-Tense version had a slightly bigger 54kWh battery (50.8kWh usable) with liquid cooling and a heat pump. It recharges either at a DC 100 kW (0-80% in 25 minutes) or at AC 11 kW (0-100% in 5 hours). DS claims a WLTP combined cycle of up to 402 km and more than 500 km in city traffic, where the new DS 3 can leverage the efficiency of its motor, its ability to recover energy, and the heat pump and thermal pre-conditioning, as well as the new, more efficient LED lights and lowered ground clearance.

Safety

Engines

References

External links

DS Inside
Citroën vehicles
DS vehicles
Electric concept cars
Production electric cars
Subcompact cars
Convertibles
Crossover sport utility vehicles
Euro NCAP superminis
Cars introduced in 2009
2010s cars
Rallycross cars